The Murat River, also called Eastern Euphrates, is a major source of the Euphrates River. The Ancient Greeks and Romans used to call the river Arsanias. It originates near Mount Ararat north of Lake Van, in Eastern Turkey, and flows westward for  through mountainous area.

In Muş Province, the river is interrupted by the Alpaslan-1 Dam, which was completed in 2009. The Alpaslan-2 Dam was completed in 2021 and is located downstream of Alpaslan-1. The river merges into the reservoir of the Keban Dam, at one time Turkey's largest dam, which was completed in 1974 and provides electrical power.

In Bingöl and Elazığ provinces, Kalehan Energy has four dams planned for the river: from upstream to downstream, the Upper Kaleköy Dam, Lower Kaleköy Dam, Beyhan I Dam, and Beyhan II Dam. The Beyhan I and Upper Kaleköy dams are already completed. Once completed, all four dams will have a combined installed capacity of 1,855 MW.

Origin of the river name 
The present name is usually connected with the Turkish Murat or its appellative murat "purpose, intention, desire". But this may be folk etymology, so Hrach Martirosyan tentatively proposes derivation from Old Armenian mōrat, murat “mud, marsh”.

The river was called Arșania in sources of the Neo-Assyrian Empire, and Arsanias in Classical Greek and Roman times. Those forms may be derived from an Armenian original (Արածանի Aratsani), itself from an Indo-European root for 'white, bright'.

Footnotes

Rivers of Turkey
Euphrates
Landforms of Muş Province
Landforms of Bingöl Province
Landforms of Elazığ Province
Eastern Anatolia Region
Mount Ararat